Colin Deacon (born November 1, 1959) is a former entrepreneur from Halifax, Nova Scotia who was appointed to the Senate of Canada on June 15, 2018. He was recommended by the Independent Advisory Board for Senate Appointments and was chosen through an open application process based on merit-based criteria requirements under the Constitution of Canada.

Life and Career 
Before the Senate

Before his appointment to the Senate, Senator Deacon was an entrepreneur in Halifax, Nova Scotia. Between 1997-2006, Senator Deacon was the CEO of SpellRead, an evidence-based reading program that taught Canadian and American teachers how to teach reading. He is the founder and former CEO of BlueLight Analytics, which offers technical products to dentists, researchers and dental manufacturers.

Senator Deacon has served as Vice-Chair of the Board of the Kids Brain Health Network and was a member of the board of the Halifax Assistance Fund, which works to help community members in need.

Senate of Canada
Since 2018, Deacon has been a member of the Standing Senate Committees on Banking, Trade and Commerce as well as Agriculture and Forestry, currently serving as Deputy Chair of the former. He is a member of the Parliamentary Network on the World Bank and International Monetary Fund, serving as Chair of the Canadian Network since 2019.

References 

Living people
1959 births
Canadian senators from Nova Scotia
Independent Senators Group
21st-century Canadian politicians